Crusader Rabbit is the first animated series produced specifically for television. Its main characters were Crusader Rabbit and his sidekick Ragland T. Tiger, or "Rags".  The stories were four-minute-long satirical cliffhangers.

The concept was test marketed in 1948, while the initial serial – Crusader vs. the State of Texas – aired on KNBH in Los Angeles beginning on August 1, 1950 (not August 1, 1949 as some sources erroneously state). The program was syndicated from 1950 to 1951 for 195 episodes, then was revived in 1959 for 260 color episodes. Jay Ward, who went on to create The Rocky and Bullwinkle Show, was involved as business manager and producer.

Production history
The concept of a cartoon series made exclusively for television came from animator Alex Anderson, who worked for Terrytoons Studios. Terrytoons turned down Anderson's proposed series, preferring to remain in theatrical film animation. Consequently, Anderson approached Jay Ward to create a partnership – Anderson being in charge of production and Ward arranging financing. Ward became business manager and producer, joining with Anderson to form "Television Arts Productions" in 1947. They tried to sell the series – initially presented as part of a proposed series, The Comic Strips of Television, which featured an earlier incarnation of Dudley Do-Right of the Mounties – to the NBC television network, with Jerry Fairbanks as the network's "supervising producer". NBC didn't broadcast Crusader Rabbit on their network, but allowed Fairbanks to sell the series in national syndication, with many NBC affiliates, including those in New York and Los Angeles, picking it up for local showings. WNBC-TV in New York continued to show the original Crusader Rabbit episodes from 1950 through 1967, and some stations used the program as late as the 1970s.

The original series employed limited animation, appearing almost as narrated storyboards with frequent cuts and minor movement by the characters, much in the style of another early NBC animated program, Tele-Comics. This was due to the limited budget that producers Jay Ward and Alex Anderson worked with to film the series. In 1948 Clarence E. Wheeler created the original opening and closing theme for the animated series, adapting and composing the folk melodies "The Trail to Mexico" (known on cue sheets as "Rabbit Fanfare") and "Ten Little Indians" (known as "Main Title Rabbit").

Each program began with a title sequence of a mounted knight galloping across the screen. The episodes then featured a short, usually satirical, adventure in the form of a movie serial, ending with a cliffhanger.

Crusader Rabbit was syndicated from 1950 to 1952, totaling 195 episodes (divided into 10 "crusades"), and then re-aired for many years. It featured Crusader Rabbit, his companion Ragland T. Tiger ("Rags"), and their occasional nemeses – Dudley Nightshade and Whetstone Whiplash with his sidekick, Bilious Green.  Some episodes featured Crusader's and Rags' friend Garfield the Groundhog. Ragland Tiger's name came from the jazz tune "Tiger Rag" and his middle initial "T" stood for The (as in Rags The Tiger), while Dudley Nightshade's name was a play on the poisonous plant, "deadly nightshade". As a running gag, another character would ask Rags what the "T" stood for, to which he would reply, "Larry. My father couldn't spell!"

The series was revived and 13 new "crusades" (totaling 260 color episodes) were produced in 1956 by Shull Bonsall's Capital Enterprises. Bonsall purchased Television Arts Productions and gained the rights to Crusader Rabbit during a protracted legal battle between Jay Ward, Alex Anderson, Jerry Fairbanks and the NBC network over ownership of the series. Animation was provided by Bonsall's Creston Studios, also known as TV Spots, Inc., supervised by Bob Ganon and Gerald Ray. The new series was not seen until early 1959.

The revived (2nd) series used an opening and closing theme from the British "Impress" production music library licensed by Emil Ascher publishing of New York. It was titled "Juggins", and was composed by Van Phillips, the professional name of Alexander Van Cleve Phillips.

Lucille Bliss provided the voice of Crusader Rabbit in the original series; she was replaced by Ge Ge Pearson in the revived series. Vern Louden played Rags in both. Dudley Nightshade was voiced by Russ Coughlan, and narration was by Roy Whaley.

Legacy
The success of Crusader Rabbit inspired many more television cartoon character packages. Jay Ward would later produce The Rocky and Bullwinkle Show.

Home video
In 1985, Rhino Entertainment released the first two volumes of Crusader Rabbit in a planned home video release of all the original episodes. However, 20th Century Fox claimed the distribution rights by their acquisition of previous owner Metromedia Producers Corporation. 20th Television currently owns the distribution rights of the show.

In 2009, AudioTape, Inc. released a three-DVD set of 11 Crusader Rabbit serials; two from the black-and-white era (including "Crusader Rabbit Vs. the State of Texas") and nine from the color era.

In popular culture
 There were two Dell Publishing comic books featuring Crusader Rabbit and Rags.
 In 2009, Lulu.com published Where Is Crusader Rabbit Now That We Really Need Him?, a biographical novel about soldiers in the Vietnam War by William K. Millar Jr.
 A Leave it to Beaver episode mentions a Crusader Rabbit sweatshirt in the lost and found.

First series
The first series aired in syndication, with production of 195 episodes ending in 1951.

Episodes
Crusader vs. the State of Texas (15 chapters)
Crusader vs. the Pirates (20 chapters)
Crusader and the Rajah of Rinsewater (20 chapters)
Crusader and the Schmohawk Indians (15 chapters)
Crusader and the Great Horse Mystery (20 chapters)
Crusader and the Circus (10 chapters)
Crusader in the Tenth Century (30 chapters)
Crusader and the Mad Hollywood Scientist (15 chapters)
Crusader and the Leprechauns (25 chapters)
Crusader and the Showboat (25 chapters)

Production staff
Executive Producer: Jerry Fairbanks
Producers: Jay Ward, Alex Anderson
Director: Alex Anderson
Story: Alex Anderson, Joe Curtin, Hal Goodman, Arthur North, Lloyd Turner
Artists: Alex Anderson, Bob Bastian, Bob Bemiller, Chuck Fusion, Randy Grochoski, Ed King, Ted Martine, Bob Mills, Lee Mishkin, Grim Natwick, Russ Sholl, Jim Scott, John Sparey, Dean Spille, Spaulding White, Volney White
Camera: Bob Oleson, Jack Williams
Music: Clarence E. Wheeler
Editor: Tom Stanford

Voices
Lucille Bliss — Crusader Rabbit
Vern Louden — Ragland T. ("Rags") Tiger
Russ Coughlin — Dudley Nightshade
Roy Whaley — Narrator

Second series
The second series premiered in 1956 syndication with 260 episodes produced, 20 "chapters" per episode. They were later edited into 13 one-hour programs.

Episodes
"The Great Uranium Hunt" (also known as "Mine Your Own Business")
"The Yukon Adventure" (also known as "Thar's Gold in Them Fills")
"Tales of Schmerwood Forest" (also known as "Crook's Tour")
"West We Forget"
"Sahara You"
"Gullible's Travels"
"Should Auld Acquaintance Be for Cotton" (also known as "Belly Acres Mystery")
"Nothing Atoll"
"Scars and Stripes"
"Apes of Rath"
"Caesar's Salad" (also known as "There's No Place Like Rome")
"The Great Baseball Mystery" (also known as "Gone With the Wind-Up")
"The Search for the Missing Link"

Production staff
Executive Producer: Shull Bonsall
Director: Sam Nicholson
Animation Director: Bob Bemiller
Story: Chris Bob Hayward, Barbara Chain
Story Sketch: Jack Miller
Music Scoring: Art Becker
Sound Effects: Ray Erlenborn, Gene Twambley
Layout: Ed Levitt
Animators: Alex Ignatiev, Bob Matz, Reuben Timmens, Joseph Price, John Sparey, Marv Woodward
Backgrounds: David Weidman, Eleanor Bogardus, Rosemary O'Connor
Ink and Paint: Martha Buckley, Maggi Alcumbrac
Production Planning: Dave Hoffman
Camera: Julian E. Raymond, Ted Bemiller
Editors: Charles McCann, Norman Vizents
Production Supervision: Bob Ganon

Voices
Ge Ge Pearson – Crusader Rabbit
Vern Louden – Ragland T. ("Rags") Tiger
Roy Whaley – Narrator
Russ Coughlan – Dudley Nightshade

See also
List of animated television series

References

Further reading
Kevin Scott Collier. The Hare Raising Tales of Crusader Rabbit. CreateSpace Independent Publishing Platform, 2018. 
Fred Patten. “2 ½ Carrots Tall: TV’s First Animated Cartoon Star: Part 1, The Story Behind Crusader Rabbit” Comics Scene #6 (November 1982), pp. 50–56; “Part 2, The Stories of Crusader Rabbit” Comics Scene #7 (February 1983), pp. 20–22.
Fred Patten. "Some Notes on Crusader Rabbit” Animatrix (UCLA Animation Workshop) #6 (Summer 1992), pp. 29–36.

External links

Crusader Rabbit at Toonopedia
"Bubble Trouble," a Crusader Rabbit children's book 

1940s American animated television series
1950s American animated television series
1949 American television series debuts
1952 American television series endings
1956 American television series debuts
1959 American television series endings
American children's animated comedy television series
Animated television series about rabbits and hares
Fictional knights
Television series by Universal Television
Male characters in animation
English-language television shows
First-run syndicated television programs in the United States